Nuku District is a district of Sandaun Province of Papua New Guinea.  Its capital is Nuku. Nuku District is a major center of Torricelli linguistic diversity.

References

Districts of Papua New Guinea
Sandaun Province